The men's 4×200 metre freestyle relay event at the 2000 Summer Olympics took place on 19 September at the Sydney International Aquatic Centre in Sydney, Australia.

After defeating the Americans to capture the 4×100 m freestyle relay title four days earlier, the Australians added another relay gold medal to their hardware in the event by the delight of a raucous home crowd. Dominating the race from start to finish, the Aussie foursome of Ian Thorpe (1:46.03), Michael Klim (1:46.40), Todd Pearson (1:47.36), and Bill Kirby (1:47.26) posted a sterling time of 7:07.05 to demolish a new world record and cut off the former Soviet Union's 1992 Olympic standard by almost four seconds.

Team USA's Scott Goldblatt (1:49.66), Josh Davis (1:46.49), Jamie Rauch (1:48.74) sent Klete Keller to be an anchor for a second-place battle. Trailing behind the Dutch and the Italians with only 25 metres left, Keller fought off a tight challenge with a split of 1:47.75 to snatch the silver for the Americans in 7:12.64. Meanwhile, the Netherlands moved from fifth-place turns by Martijn Zuijdweg (1:49.60), Johan Kenkhuis (1:51.18), and Marcel Wouda (1:48.56) to race on the final stretch for the bronze in 7:12.70, after producing a superb anchor of 1:44.88, the fastest split of all time, set by Olympic champion Pieter van den Hoogenband.

The Italian team of Andrea Beccari (1:49.67), Matteo Pelliciari (1:48.41), Emiliano Brembilla (1:48.92), and Massimiliano Rosolino (1:45.91) missed the podium with a fourth-place time of 7:12.91, holding off the fast-pacing Brits' Edward Sinclair (1:49.61), Paul Palmer (1:47.15), Marc Spackman (1:48.85), and James Salter (1:47.37) by seven-hundredths of a second (7:12.98). Germany (7:20.19), Canada (7:21.92), and Russia (7:24.37) rounded out the championship finale.

Records
Prior to this competition, the existing world and Olympic records were as follows.

The following new world and Olympic records were set during this competition.

Results

Heats

Final

References

External links
Official Olympic Report

Mens
4 × 200 metre freestyle relay
Men's events at the 2000 Summer Olympics